"Braid My Hair" is a R&B single by Mario. It is the second single from his first studio album Mario. The single was released in October 2002. The single was produced and written by Warryn Campbell and written by Harold Lilly.

Music video
The video was directed by Bryan Barber.

Track listing
 "Braid My Hair" (Radio Edit)
 Instrumental
 Call Out Hook

"Just a Friend" / "Braid My Hair" DVD single
 "Just a Friend"
 "Braid My Hair"

Videos
 "Just a Friend"
 "Braid My Hair"

 The Making of "Braid My Hair"

Charts

References

2002 singles
Mario (singer) songs
Music videos directed by Bryan Barber
Songs written by Warryn Campbell
Song recordings produced by Warryn Campbell
Songs written by Harold Lilly (songwriter)
2002 songs
J Records singles